Bia hơi or Bia tươi (literally "fresh beer"), is a type of draught beer popular in Vietnam.

Bia hơi is available primarily in northern Vietnam. It is mostly to be found in small bars and on street corners. The beer is brewed daily, then matured for a short period and once ready each bar gets a fresh batch delivered every day in steel barrels. It is a very light (around 3% alcohol) refreshing lager at a fraction of the cost of draft or bottled beer in the Western-style bars. Bia hơi production is informal and not monitored by any health agency.

As of September 2020 a small cup is typically priced between 5,000₫ (US$) and 11,000₫ ($).

References

Vietnamese alcoholic drinks
Beer in Vietnam